Sargocentron spinosissimum is a species of fish in the squirrelfishes.

References

External links
 
 

spinosissimum
Fish described in 1843